John Donald Daly (1841 – January 1, 1923) was a California businessman and landowner from Boston, Massachusetts. The city of Daly City, California, was named after him when it was incorporated in 1911. He is widely regarded as the "father of Daly City" and is an important figure in the history of the city that bears his name. He also opened the city's first bank.

References

Bibliography

External links
 An Overview of Daly City History (archived)
 Chapter 5 of Gateway to the Peninsula (archived)
 Fog Cutter Community Newsletter, Vol 6, No. 2, Summer 2006 (archived)

 City of Daly City

1841 births
1923 deaths
Daly City, California
American bankers
People from Boston
19th-century American businesspeople
20th-century American businesspeople
Deaths from pneumonia in the United States